Lugh Ganane Airport  is an airport serving Luuq, Somalia.

See also
Transport in Somalia

References

 Great Circle Mapper - Lugh
 Google Earth

Airports in Somalia